Ajay Kumar may refer to:

 Ajay Kumar (actor) (born 1976), Indian actor, aka Guinness Pakru
 Ajay Kumar (civil servant) (born 1962), Indian Administrative Service officer and current Defence Production Secretary of India
 Ajay Kumar (cricketer) (born 1989), Indian cricketer
 Ajay Kumar (Bihar politician), Bihar State Assembly member 
 Ajay Kumar (politician) (born 1962), Indian Lok Sabha politician and former police officer
 Ajay Kumar Reddy (born 1990), Indian blind cricketer and current Indian blind cricket captain
 Ajay Kumar Lallu, Indian politician and member of 16th Uttar Pradesh Assembly